Notti magiche (Magical Nights) is an Italian comedy film directed by Paolo Virzì, an homage to the season of the Italian-style comedy.

Plot
On 3 July 1990, during the semi-final between Italy and Argentina at the 1990 FIFA World Cup, a film producer is found dead in the Tiber and three young aspiring screenwriters are the main suspects in the murder. During a night in the barracks, their sentimental and ironic journey is traced, describing the splendour and misery of a glorious period of the Italian cinema that is slowly fading away.

Cast
 
 Mauro Lamantia as Antonino Scordia
 Giovanni Toscano as Luciano Ambrogi
 Irene Vetere as Eugenia Malaspina
 Roberto Herlitzka as Fulvio Zappellini
 Giancarlo Giannini as Leandro Saponaro
 Ornella Muti as Federica
 Giulio Berruti as Max Andrei
 Giulio Scarpati as Salvatore Malaspina
 Paolo Bonacelli as Ennio

Distribution
The film has been presented on 27 October 2018 at the Rome Film Festival and came out in the Italian theatres on 8 November 2018.

References

External links

2018 films
2018 comedy films
Italian comedy films
2010s Italian-language films
Films directed by Paolo Virzì
Films set in 1990
Films set in Rome
Films about screenwriters